On-and-On (April 24, 1956 – 1970) was an American Thoroughbred racehorse who was a top runner for owner/breeder Calumet Farm and the sire of their 1968 Kentucky Derby and Preakness Stakes winner, Forward Pass and the damsire of U.S. Racing Hall of Fame inductee Alydar.

Bred in Kentucky, On-and-On was trained by future U.S. Racing Hall of Fame inductee Jimmy Jones The colt did not develop enough to compete in any of the 1959 U.S. Triple Crown races but went on to win the Ohio Derby and at age four earned wins in important events such as the Brooklyn McLennan and Tropical Park Handicaps, setting a new track record for a mile and eighth on dirt in the latter that was only 1/5 of a second off the world record.

On-and-On died in 1970 and was buried in Calumet Farm's equine cemetery.

Pedigree

References

1956 racehorse births
Racehorses bred in Kentucky
Racehorses trained in the United States
Horse racing track record setters
Thoroughbred family 23-b